James King is a professional rugby league footballer who played in the 2000s.

International honours
James King won caps for Ireland while at Barrow Raiders 2003 2-caps.

References

1980 births
Living people
Barrow Raiders players
Ireland national rugby league team players
Leigh Leopards players
Place of birth missing (living people)
Rugby league second-rows